The American Board of Physician Specialties (ABPS), the official certifying body for the American Association of Physician Specialists (AAPS) is a non-profit umbrella organization for sixteen medical specialty boards that certifies and re-certifies physicians in fourteen medical specialties in the United States and Canada. The ABPS is one of three organizations overseeing Doctor of Medicine (M.D.) and Doctor of Osteopathic Medicine (D.O.) certification in the United States.  The ABPS assists its Member Boards in developing and implementing educational and professional standards to evaluate and certify physician specialists. It is recognized by the U.S. Department of Labor as well as the Centers for Medicare and Medicaid Services (CMS).

History
The American Association of Physician Specialists (AAPS) is the smallest of three multi-specialty physician/surgeon certifying entities in the United States, providing board certification to both M.D. and D.O. physicians.  The AAPS has grouped its certification activities within a single subdivision called the American Board of Physician Specialties (ABPS).  In August 2005, the ABPS name was registered to AAPS.  The ABPS implements certification functions under the direction of AAPS.

AAPS (originally known as the American Association of Osteopathic Physicians was founded in 1952 by Dr. E.O. Martin.  Since 1984, AAPS has provided a headquarters for medical specialty boards of certification.

Recognition by state medical boards
Today in the U.S. and its territories, there are seventy (70) state medical boards—some state medical boards are composed of an M.D. board and a D.O. board while others are combined as one, called a "composite board". Of the 70 state boards, the vast majority do not differentiate between any of the three nationally recognized multi-specialty boards of certification (ABMS, ABPS, AOABOS).  In other words, the majority of the state medical boards are silent (or neutral) as to which board a given physician is certified by.

The remaining boards, approximately twenty (20), have established specific rules for physician advertising by which boards have to petition and receive permission for physicians to be able to advertise themselves as "board certified".

Those twenty (20) boards are:

 Arizona Medical Board
 Arizona Board of Osteopathic Examiners
 Medical Board of California Osteopathic
 Medical Board of California
 Florida Board of Medicine (ABPS is Recognized)
 Florida Board of Osteopathic Medicine (ABPS is Recognized)
 Louisiana State Board of Medical Examiners
 Missouri State Board of Registration for the Healing Arts 
 New Jersey State Board of Medical Examiners
 New York State Board for Medicine (ABPS not recognized as equal to AMBS certification)
 North Carolina Medical Board
 Oklahoma State Board of Medical Licensure and Supervision (ABPS is Recognized)
 Oklahoma State Board of Osteopathic Examiners (ABPS is Recognized)
 Oregon Medical Board
 Pennsylvania State Board of Medicine 
 Pennsylvania State Board of Osteopathic Medicine (ABPS is Recognized)
 South Carolina Board of Medical Examiners
 Texas Medical Board (ABPS is Recognized)
 Utah Department of Commerce (Physicians Licensing Board) 
 Utah Department of Commerce (Board of Osteopathic Medicine) (ABPS is Recognized)

Physicians certified by ABPS and licensed by the Medical Board of California are prohibited from using the term "board certified" unless they are also certified by an American Board of Medical Specialties board.

It also appears that certification by an ABPS member board is not sufficient to allow use of the term "board certified" by physicians licensed in the State of New York.  However, interpreting the law in New York is more complex.

Specialties
The ABPS, the official certifying body of the American Association of Physician Specialists (AAPS), is the United States' third largest recognized physician multi-specialty certifying body, providing physician board certification re-certification for thousands of physicians in following 20 medical specialties:
 Administrative Medicine
 Anesthesiology
 Dermatology
 Diagnostic Radiology
 Disaster Medicine- American Board of Disaster Medicine (ABODM)
 Emergency Medicine- Board of Certification in Emergency Medicine (BCEM)
 Family Medicine Obstetrics
 Family Practice      
 Geriatric Medicine
 Hospital Medicine
 Integrative Medicine
 Internal Medicine
 Obstetrics and Gynecology
 Ophthalmology
 Orthopedic Surgery 
 Plastic & Reconstructive Surgery        
 Psychiatry          
 Radiation Oncology
 Surgery
 Urgent Care

See also
 American Board of Medical Specialties
 American Osteopathic Association Bureau of Osteopathic Specialists
 Board of Certification in Emergency Medicine

References

External links
 American Board of Physician Specialties
 American Association of Physician Specialists, Inc.

Medical associations based in the United States
Medical and health organizations based in Florida